

Club records

The following are club records since its establishment in 1899.

Only competitive, professional matches, as of March 2023

Players in bold still play for the club

Most appearances

Top goalscorers

Transfers

Record transfer fees paid

Record transfer fees received

References

Records
English football club statistics